Ejby is the name of several small towns and a former municipality in Denmark:

 Ejby Municipality, now included in Middelfart Municipality
 Ejby, Middelfart Municipality
 Ejby, Glostrup Municipality, a suburb in Glostrup Municipality near Copenhagen
 Ejby, Køge Municipality
 Ejby, Lejre Municipality

it:Ejby
pt:Ejby